HMS Birmingham was lead ship of the Birmingham group of three ships of the  of light cruisers built by the Royal Navy. The three ships were virtually identical to the third group of Town-class ships, but with an additional  gun worked in on the forecastle.

History
Birmingham, a two-screw ship, was built at Elswick, launched on 7 May 1913 and completed on 30 January 1914. She joined the 1st Light Cruiser Squadron of the Grand Fleet in 1914, visiting Kiel in June that year.

The crew of Birmingham could hear hammering from inside the boat from attempted repairs, and so fired on her but missed. As the U-boat began to dive, she rammed her, cutting her in two. U-15 went down with all hands, the first U-boat loss to an enemy warship. Birmingham also sank two German merchant ships that year and took part in the Battle of Heligoland on 28 August, and the Battle of Dogger Bank in January 1915.

In February, she joined the 2nd Light Cruiser Squadron, attacking a u-boat on 18 June 1915 without success.

She also took part in the Battle of Jutland as a member of the 2nd Light Cruiser Squadron, during which she sustained damage caused by splintering during the night of the battle.

After the First World War, she was flagship to the 6th Light Cruiser Squadron in 1919-1920, after which she was transferred to the Nore from 1920-1922. Considered (with two other two shaft 'Towns') for conversion to a minelayer, but the idea was not pursued. She was recommissioned in November 1923 to the Africa Station with the 6th Light Cruiser Squadron as Flagship, relieving Lowestoft. She then continued to serve in foreign stations until being sold in 1931. She arrived at the yards of Thos. W. Ward, of Pembroke Dock on 12 March that year to be broken up.

Notes

Bibliography

External links 
 Ships of the Birmingham group
 "An Echo from Jutland" Pathe newsreel dated 24 October 1921, in which the Lord Mayor of Birmingham receives the ship's battle scarred ensign.
  OldWeather.org transcription of ship's logbooks June 1919 to June 1921
Battle of Jutland Crew Lists Project - HMS Birmingham Crew List

 

Town-class cruisers (1910) of the Royal Navy
Ships built by Armstrong Whitworth
Ships built on the River Tyne
1913 ships
World War I cruisers of the United Kingdom